Melody Sucharewicz is the winner of the second season of Israel's popular TV show, The Ambassador, and a former foreign affairs adviser and spokesperson of Israel's Alternate Prime Minister, Defense Minister, and Blue and White Chairman, Benny Gantz.  

"The Ambassador" is a reality series resembling Donald Trump's The Apprentice TV format, though instead of business its theme is public diplomacy and political PR. Elected among hundreds of candidates.

The aim is to choose, amongst several thousands of young professionals, a spokesperson for Israel. Rhetoric and diplomatic skills, social competence, coping with hostile media, and skills in creative political PR of 14 final candidates were tested throughout a series of international challenges (Uganda, Sweden, Russia, United States), later broadcast on Israel's Channel Two. The three finalists of the show held speeches on their vision of peace at the headquarters of the United Nations in New York.

Chosen as the winner by a high-profile committee (IDF General Gil Regev, journalist Rina Mazliach, media anchor Nachman Shai), Melody traveled around the world as a good will ambassador for Israel for one year. Her activities ranged from speaking engagements at the European Parliament to media appearances, publications and interviews concerning Israel's perception in the media and the Middle East peace process.

Born in Germany (Munich) in 1980, Melody Sucharewicz immigrated to Israel at the age of 19, where she earned a B.A. in sociology and anthropology and an M.Sc. in management sciences at Tel Aviv University. Currently, she is pursuing a PhD at the Department of War Studies of King's College London.

After finalizing her year as an international good will ambassador, she returned to Israel, where she worked as an international relations adviser for the Peres Center for Peace. She was also the director of the German Israel Congress, Europe's largest pro-Israel event with 3000 participants, aiming at strengthening bilateral ties between Israel and Germany. Melody continues to work as a representative for Israel, with most engagements taking place in Germany and Israel, where she works as a political communications and strategy consultant, moderates and speaks at high-profile conferences and events.

References

External links
 melody.info

Living people
People from Munich
Tel Aviv University alumni
Alumni of King's College London
1980 births
German emigrants to Israel
German people of Israeli descent
Israeli expatriates in England